The 2022–23 Tampa Bay Lightning season is the 31st season for the National Hockey League (NHL) franchise that was established on December 16, 1991. They entered this season as defending Eastern Conference champions.

Off-season

June
The Lightning's off-season began after losing to the Colorado Avalanche in game six of the 2022 Stanley Cup Finals. Despite the loss, the Lightning were the first team since the mid-1980s to make three consecutive Stanley Cup Finals.

On June 30, 2022, the Lightning announced that Darren Raddysh had been re-signed to a 2-year contract extension. Raddysh made his NHL debut last season with the Lightning, and appeared in four games.

That same day it was announced that assistant coach Derek Lalonde was hired by the Detroit Red Wings to be their new head coach. Lalonde had served as an assistant to Jon Cooper since 2018, and was a member of the 2020 and 2021 championships.

July
On July 1, 2022, the Lightning announced the re-signing of Nick Paul to a 7-year contract extension valued at $22.05 million. Paul was acquired by the Lightning from the Ottawa Senators prior to the NHL trade deadline. Paul appeared in 23 post season games on their trip to the Stanley Cup Finals, recording five goals and four assists.

That same day the Lightning placed goalie prospect Amir Miftakhov on unconditional waivers or the purpose of a buyout. Miftakhov was drafted in the sixth-round of the 2020 NHL Entry Draft. Miftakhov spent time with the Orlando Solar Bears of the ECHL and the Syracuse Crunch of the American Hockey League. Miftakhov has two years remaining on his entry level contract. Miftakhov cleared waivers the following day.

On July 3, 2022, the Lightning traded defenseman Ryan McDonagh to the Nashville Predators in exchange for defenseman Philippe Myers and forward Grant Mismash. McDonagh spent the past five seasons with the lightning after coming over in a trade from the New York Rangers. McDonagh appeared in 267 regular season games with the Lightning, recording 20 goals and 99 points. McDonagh ranks third all time amongst Lightning defensemen in the playoffs in games (89), assists (21) and points (23). McDonagh also helped the team capture two Stanley Cup Championships and appear in three consecutive finals. The main purpose of the trade for the Lightning was to help obtain salary cap relief both the upcoming season and going forward. After the trade the Lightning had 6.75m in cap that they can use to try and re-sign players or use in free agency.

On July 7, 2022, the Lightning selected forward Isaac Howard from the U.S. National Development Program with the 31st pick in the 2022 NHL Entry Draft. This was the Lightning's first time selecting in the first-round since 2019. Howard recorded 82 points in 60 games this past season. Howard is committed to play colligate hockey for the University of Minnesota Duluth.

The following day the Lightning selected forwards Lucas Edmonds, Connor Kurth, Klavs Veinbergs, goaltender Nick Malik and defenseman Dyllan Gill.

On July 11, 2022, the Lightning re-signed goaltender Maxime Lagace to a 1-year contract extension. Lagace played in two games with the Lightning this past season, going 1-1-0. Lagace spent most of the season with the Syracuse Crunch, posting a 23-9-2 record.

The same day the Lightning declined to issue qualifying offers to Tye Felhaber, Otto Somppi, Odeen Tufto, Alex Green and Alexei Melnichuk. All of these players became unrestricted free agents on July 13, 2022.

On July 12, 2022, the Lightning announced the signing of Jeff Blashill as an assistant coach. Blashill had served as the head coach of the Detroit Red Wings over the past seven seasons.

Free Agency

July 13, 2022, was the first day of NHL free agency. The Lightning were involved in the following signings and player departures:

Forward Felix Robert was signed to a 2-year entry level contract. Robert spent the past two seasons with the Wilkes-Barre/Scranton Penguins of the AHL. Roberts has skated in 90 games, recording 22 goals and 47 points. Roberts originally signed with the Pittsburgh Penguins as an undrafted free agent from the Sherbrooke Phoenix of the Quebec Major Junior Hockey League. Roberts is expected to join the Lightning's AHL affiliate in Syracuse.

Defenseman Ian Cole was signed to a 1-year deal, valued at $3 million dollars. Cole skated in 75 games with the Carolina Hurricanes this past season, recording two goals and 17 assists. Cole has appeared in 670 games over his 12 seasons NHL career. He was also a member of the Penguins' back to back championship teams in 2016 and 2017.

Forward Vladislav Namestnikov was signed to a 1-year contract, valued at $2.5 million dollars. Namestnikov appeared in 75 games this past season between the Detroit Red Wings and Dallas Stars. He recorded 16 goals and 30 points over that stretch. Namestnikov was originally drafted by the Lightning in the first round of 2011 NHL Entry Draft. Namestnikov also made his NHL debut with the club during the 2013–14 season. Namestnikov was eventually part of the trade package that brought over Ryan McDonagh and J. T. Miller from the New York Rangers.

Defenseman Haydn Fleury was signed to a 2-year contract that carries an annual cap hit of 762k. Fleury skated in 36 games this past season with the Seattle Kraken, recording two goals and four points. Fleury has appeared in 215 career NHL games between Seattle, Anaheim Ducks and Carolina Hurricanes. Fleury was part of Seattle's inaugural season after being claimed in the 2021 NHL Expansion Draft. Fleury was available to the Lightning after not receiving a qualifying offer from Seattle.

The Lightning lost the following players in initial period free agency:

Forward Charles Hudon signed a on-year contract with the Colorado Avalanche. Hudon appeared in 66 games with the Syracuse Crunch last season, recording 30 goals, 27 assists and 57 points. Hudon did not appear in any games with the Lightning last season.

Forward Anthony Richard signed a 1-year contract with the Montreal Canadiens. Richard played 71 games in the AHL last season, between the Milwaukee Admirals and Syracuse Crunch.

Defenseman Jan Rutta signed a 3-year contract with the Pittsburgh Penguins. The contract is worth $8.25 million, and carries an annual cap hit of $2.75 million. Rutta played for the Lightning over the past four seasons, and helped the team win two Stanley Cup championships.

Forward Ondrej Palat signed a 5-year contract with the New Jersey Devils. The contract carries an annual cap hit of $6 million. Palat had spent his entire 10-year NHL career with the Lightning. Palat finished his career with the Lightning with 143 goals, 280 assists and 423 points. Palat also helped the Lightning to capture two Stanley Cup championships and appear in four Stanley Cup finals.

Re-signings

On the first day of free agency the Lightning re-signed the following players:

Defenseman Mikhail Sergachev was signed to an 8-year contract extension valued at $68 million. Sergachev was former 9th overall pick that came over via trade for Jonathan Drouin from the Montreal Canadiens prior to the 2017–18 season. Sergachev saw his role gradually increase to the Lightning during the team's run to two Stanley Cups, and is expected to take on a regular top-4 role.

Forward Anthony Cirelli was signed to an 8-year contract extension valued at $50 million. Cirelli came to the Lightning via a third round pick in the 2015 NHL Entry Draft. Cirelli has developed into a two-way, second line center. In that capacity Cirelli is often tasked in a shutdown role, which regularly sees him matched up against other team's top line. Cirelli has appeared in 294 games, recording 66 goals and 159 points. He has also put up 14 goals and 34 points in 92 playoff games, which also included winning two Stanley Cups with the team.

Defenseman Erik Cernak was signed to an 8-year contract extension valued at $41.6 million. Cernak was originally drafted by the Los Angeles Kings in the 2015 NHL Entry Draft and was subsequently traded to the Lightning in the trade for goaltender Ben Bishop. Cernak spent one season in the minors before graduating to the Lightning roster during the 2018–19 season. Cernak became a defensive minded top-4 defenseman for the team. Cernak has appeared in 226 NHL games, recording 16 goals and 59 points. In the playoffs Cernak has two goals and 19 points over 73 playoff games. Cernak was also a member of the back-to-back Stanley Cup championships.

Post Free Agency Frenzy

On July 22, 2022, the Lightning signed forward Lucas Edmonds to a three year entry level contract. Edmonds joined the organization via the 2022 NHL Entry Draft in the third-round. Edmonds played most of his juniors career in Sweden before moving to the Ontario Hockey League with the Kingston Frontenacs this past season. He recorded 34 goals, 79 assists and 113 points in 68 games with the Frontenacs.

On July 25, 2022, the Lightning signed defensemen Trevor Carrick to a 1-year contract. Carrick was with the San Diego Gulls of the AHL this past season. Carrick appeared in 61 games, recording 10 goals, 20 assists and 30 points.

August

On August 17, 2022, former Lightning prospect Cole Guttman signed as a free agent out of college with the Chicago Blackhawks. Guttman was originally drafted in the 6th-round by the Lightning in the 2017 NHL Entry Draft. Guttman became a free agent after not signing with the Lightning after the August 15th deadline this year. Guttman played last season with the University of Denver. Guttman captained the team to the 2022 NCAA Hockey Championship.  

On August 18, 2022, former Lightning prospect Sammy Walker signed as a free agent out of college with the Minnesota Wild. Walker was originally a 7th-round draft pick by the Lightning in the 2017 NHL Entry Draft. Walker was a made a free agent after not signing with the Lightning after the August 15th deadline this year. Walker spent the previous four years at the University of Minnesota.

September
  
On September 13, 2022, the Lightning announced its 30th anniversary celebration for the season. As part of this announcement the team will create a Lightning Hockey Hall of Fame. The first class will be inducted during a home game in the spring. The exact date and members to be inducted is to be determined at a later date.

Training camp

September

On September 19, 2022, the Lightning announced its training camp roster for the coming season. The roster is made up of 29 forwards, 21 defensemen and six goaltenders. 

Forward Group

Alex Barre-Boulet, Pierre-Edouard Bellemare, Maxim Cajkovic, Anthony Cirelli, Ross Colton, Gabriel Dumont, Jaydon Dureau, Lucas Edmonds, Shawn Element, Jack Finley, Gabriel Fortier, Gage Goncalves, Brandon Hagel, Alex Killorn, Cole Koepke, Nikita Kucherov, Pierre-Cedric Labrie, Bennett MacArthur, Patrick Maroon, Grant Mismash, Vladislav Namestnikov, Nick Paul, Corey Perry, Brayden Point, Felix Robert, Simon Ryfors, Gemel Smith, Steven Stamkos and Ilya Usau. 

Defensemen Group

Zach Bogosian, Declan Carlile, Trevor Carrick, Erik Cernak, Ian Cole, Sean Day, Tyson Feist, Haydn Fleury, Cal Foote, Dyllan Gill, Victor Hedman, Ryan Jones, Cameron MacDonald, Philippe Myers, Nick Perbix, Darren Raddysh, Roman Schmidt, Dmitry Semykin, Mikhail Sergachev, Jack Thompson and Daniel Walcott.

Goalie Group

Hugo Alnefelt, Brad Barone, Brian Elliott, Jack LaFontaine, Maxime Lagace and Andrei Vasilevskiy. 

Roster Reductions     

On September 28, 2022, the Lightning returned prospect Roman Schmidt to the Kitchener Rangers of the Ontario Hockey League. The move reduced the Lightning's camp roster to 55 players.

October

On October 1, 2022, the Lightning announced that it had reduced its training camp roster down to 38 players. The following players were assigned to the Syracuse Crunch: Hugo Alnefelt, Declan Carlile, Trevor Carrick, Jaydon Dureau, Lucas Edmonds, Jack Finley, Gage Goncalves, Maxime Lagace, Bennett MacArthur, Grant Mismash, Darren Raddysh, Felix Robert, Simon Ryfors, Dmitry Semykin, Jack Thompson, Ilya Usau and Daniel Walcott.   

On October 2, 2022, the Lightning further reduced their roster by 9 players. The following players were assigned to the Syracuse Crunch: Maxim Cajkovic, Gabriel Dumont, Shawn Element, Tyson Feist, Ryan Jones and Jack LaFontaine. Additionally, Dyllan Gill and Cameron MacDonald were returned to their junior teams and Brad Barone was released from his camp tryout. 

On October 4, 2022, the Lightning reduced its roster by 3 players. Alex Barré-Boulet, Gemel Smith and Sean Day were the players assigned to the Syracuse Crunch. The move brought the Lightning's roster count down to 26 players.  

On October 7, 2022, the Lightning reduced its roster down to 24 players. Defensive prospect Nick Perbix was assigned to the Syracuse Crunch and forward Pierre-Cédric Labrie was released from his camp tryout agreement. Labrie will also be joining the Crunch as he is still under contract with that team on a AHL only contract.

On October 9, 2022, the Lightning signed forward Pierre-Cedric Labrie to a 1-year contract. Labrie spent the previous season between the Hartford Wolf Pack and the Syracuse Crunch. This signing replaces Labrie's AHL only contract with the team.  

That evening the Lightning suspended defensemen Ian Cole pending an investigation into allegations involving the sexual abuse of a woman when she was a minor. The allegations came to light via a social media post.

On October 11, 2022, the Lightning's season opening roster was finalized. The forward group is made up of Pierre-Edouard Bellemare, Ross Colton, Gabriel Fortier, Brandon Hagel, Cole Koepke, Alex Killorn, Nikita Kucherov, Nick Paul, Corey Perry, Patrick Maroon, Vladislav Namestnikov, Brayden Point and Steven Stamkos. The defense consists of Erik Cernak, Ian Cole, Haydn Fleury, Cal Foote, Victor Hedman, Philippe Myers and Mikhail Sergachev. The goalie tandem of Andrei Vasilevskiy and Brian Elliott rounds out the roster.

Standings

Divisional standings

Conference standings

Schedule and results

Preseason

|- align="center" bgcolor="ffcccc"
| 1 || September 27 || @ Carolina Hurricanes || 1–5 ||  || Lagace || PNC Arena || 10,083 || 0–1–0 || 
|- align="center" bgcolor="bbbbbb"
| — || September 28 || Carolina Hurricanes || colspan="7"|Game cancelled due to the impending threat from Hurricane Ian.
|- align="center" bgcolor="bbbbbb"
| — || September 29 || Nashville Predators || colspan="7"|Game moved to Nashville due to the impending threat from Hurricane Ian.
|- align="center" bgcolor="ffcccc"
| 2 || September 29 || vs. Nashville Predators || 0–2 ||  || Elliott || Bridgestone Arena || 7,492 || 0–2–0 || 
|- align="center" bgcolor="ffcccc"
| 3 || September 30 || @ Nashville Predators || 1–7 ||  || Alnefelt || Bridgestone Arena || 15,884 || 0–3–0 || 
|- align="center" bgcolor="ffcccc"
| 4 || October 6 || @ Florida Panthers || 2–3 ||  || Vasilevskiy || FLA Live Arena || 11,350 || 0–4–0 || 
|- align="center" bgcolor="ccffcc"
| 5 || October 8 || Florida Panthers || 5–2 ||  || Vasilevskiy || Amalie Arena || 19,092 || 1–4–0 || 
|-

|-
| Lightning score listed first;

Regular season

|- align="center" bgcolor="ffcccc"
| 1 || October 11 || @ New York Rangers || 1–3 ||  || Vasilevskiy || Madison Square Garden || 18,006 || 0–1–0 || 0 || 
|- align="center" bgcolor="ccffcc"
| 2 || October 14 || @ Columbus Blue Jackets || 5–2 ||  || Vasilevskiy || Nationwide Arena || 18,889 || 1–1–0 || 2 || 
|- align="center" bgcolor="ffcccc"
| 3 || October 15 || @ Pittsburgh Penguins || 2–6 ||  || Elliott || PPG Paints Arena || 18,416 || 1–2–0 || 2 || 
|- align="center" bgcolor="ffcccc"
| 4 || October 18 || Philadelphia Flyers || 2–3 ||  || Vasilevskiy || Amalie Arena || 19,092 || 1–3–0 || 2 || 
|- align="center" bgcolor="ccffcc"
| 5 || October 21 || @ Florida Panthers || 3–2 || OT || Vasilevskiy || FLA Live Arena || 17,531 || 2–3–0 || 4 || 
|- align="center" bgcolor="ccffcc"
| 6 || October 22 || New York Islanders || 5–3 ||  || Elliott || Amalie Arena || 19,092 || 3–3–0 || 6 || 
|- align="center" bgcolor="ffcccc"
| 7 || October 25 || @ Los Angeles Kings || 2–4 ||  || Vasilevskiy || Crypto.com Arena || 16,480 || 3–4–0 || 6 || 
|- align="center" bgcolor="ccffcc"
| 8 || October 26 || @ Anaheim Ducks || 4–2 ||  || Elliott || Honda Center || 14,889 || 4–4–0 || 8 || 
|- align="center" bgcolor="ccffcc"
| 9 || October 29 || @ San Jose Sharks || 4–3 ||  || Vasilevskiy || SAP Center || 15,122 || 5–4–0 || 10 || 

|- align="center" bgcolor="ccffcc"
| 10 || November 1 || Ottawa Senators || 4–3 ||  || Vasilevskiy || Amalie Arena || 19,092 || 6–4–0 || 12 || 
|- align="center" bgcolor="B0C4DE"
| 11 || November 3 || Carolina Hurricanes || 3–4 || SO || Vasilevskiy || Amalie Arena || 19,092 || 6–4–1 || 13 || 
|- align="center" bgcolor="ccffcc"
| 12 || November 5 || Buffalo Sabres || 5–3 ||  || Elliott || Amalie Arena || 19,092 || 7–4–1 || 15 || 
|- align="center" bgcolor="ffcccc"
| 13 || November 8 || Edmonton Oilers || 2–3 ||  || Vasilevskiy || Amalie Arena || 19,092 || 7–5–1 || 15 || 
|- align="center" bgcolor="ffcccc"
| 14 || November 11 || @ Washington Capitals || 1–5 ||  || Vasilevskiy || Capital One Arena || 18,573 || 7–6–1 || 15 || 
|- align="center" bgcolor="ccffcc"
| 15 || November 13 || Washington Capitals || 6–3 ||  || Vasilevskiy || Amalie Arena || 19,092 || 8–6–1 || 17 || 
|- align="center" bgcolor="ccffcc"
| 16 || November 15 || Dallas Stars || 5–4 || OT || Elliott || Amalie Arena || 19,092 || 9–6–1 || 19 || 
|- align="center" bgcolor="ccffcc"
| 17 || November 17 || Calgary Flames || 4–1 ||  || Vasilevskiy || Amalie Arena || 19,092 || 10–6–1 || 21 || 
|- align="center" bgcolor="ccffcc"
| 18 || November 19 || @ Nashville Predators || 3–2 || OT || Vasilevskiy || Bridgestone Arena || 17,444 || 11–6–1 || 23 || 
|- align="center" bgcolor="ffcccc"
| 19 || November 21 || Boston Bruins || 3–5 ||  || Vasilevskiy || Amalie Arena || 19,092 || 11–7–1 || 23 || 
|- align="center" bgcolor="ccffcc"
| 20 || November 25 || St. Louis Blues || 5–2 ||  || Vasilevskiy || Amalie Arena || 19,092 || 12–7–1 || 25 || 
|- align="center" bgcolor="ccffcc"
| 21 || November 28 || @ Buffalo Sabres || 6–5 || OT || Elliott || KeyBank Center || 11,766 || 13–7–1 || 27 || 
|- align="center" bgcolor="ffcccc"
| 22 || November 29 || @ Boston Bruins || 1–3 ||  || Vasilevskiy || TD Garden || 17,850 || 13–8–1 || 27 || 

|- align="center" bgcolor="ccffcc"
| 23 || December 1 || @ Philadelphia Flyers || 4–1 ||  || Vasilevskiy || Wells Fargo Center || 17,867 || 14–8–1 || 29 || 
|- align="center" bgcolor="ccffcc"
| 24 || December 3 || Toronto Maple Leafs || 4–3 || OT || Vasilevskiy || Amalie Arena || 19,092 || 15–8–1 || 31 || 
|- align="center" bgcolor="ffcccc"
| 25 || December 6 || Detroit Red Wings || 2–4 ||  || Vasilevskiy || Amalie Arena || 19,092 || 15–9–1 || 31 || 
|- align="center" bgcolor="ccffcc"
| 26 || December 8 || Nashville Predators || 5–2 ||  || Elliott || Amalie Arena || 19,092 || 16–9–1 || 33 || 
|- align="center" bgcolor="ccffcc"
| 27 || December 10 || Florida Panthers || 4–1 ||  || Vasilevskiy || Amalie Arena || 19,092 || 17–9–1 || 35 || 
|- align="center" bgcolor="ccffcc"
| 28 || December 13 || Seattle Kraken || 6–2 ||  || Vasilevskiy || Amalie Arena || 19,092 || 18–9–1 || 37 || 
|- align="center" bgcolor="ccffcc"
| 29 || December 15 || Columbus Blue Jackets || 4–1 ||  || Elliott || Amalie Arena || 19,092 || 19–9–1 || 39 || 
|- align="center" bgcolor="ccffcc"
| 30 || December 17 || @ Montreal Canadiens || 5–1 ||  || Vasilevskiy || Bell Centre || 21,105 || 20–9–1 || 41 || 
|- align="center" bgcolor="ffcccc"
| 31 || December 20 || @ Toronto Maple Leafs || 1–4 ||  || Vasilevskiy || Scotiabank Arena || 18,962 || 20–10–1 || 41 || 
|- align="center" bgcolor="ffcccc"
| 32 || December 21 || @ Detroit Red Wings || 4–7 ||  || Elliott  || Little Caesars Arena || 19,515 || 20–11–1 || 41 || 
|- align="center" bgcolor="cccccc"
| — || December 23 || @ Buffalo Sabres || colspan="8"|Postponed due to winter storm. Moved to March 4.
|- align="center" bgcolor="ccffcc"
| 33 || December 28 || Montreal Canadiens || 4–1 ||  || Vasilevskiy || Amalie Arena || 19,092 || 21–11–1 || 43 || 
|- align="center" bgcolor="ccffcc"
| 34 || December 29 || New York Rangers || 2–1 || SO || Vasilevskiy || Amalie Arena || 19,092 || 22–11–1 || 45 || 
|- align="center" bgcolor="ccffcc"
| 35 || December 31 || Arizona Coyotes || 5–3 ||  || Vasilevskiy || Amalie Arena || 19,092 || 23–11–1 || 47 || 

|- align="center" bgcolor="ccffcc"
| 36 || January 3 || @ Chicago Blackhawks || 4–1 ||  || Elliott || United Center || 18,429 || 24–11–1 || 49 || 
|- align="center" bgcolor="ffcccc"
| 37 || January 4 || @ Minnesota Wild || 1–5 ||  || Elliott || Xcel Energy Center || 18,427 || 24–12–1 || 49 || 
|- align="center" bgcolor="ffcccc"
| 38 || January 6 || @ Winnipeg Jets || 2–4 ||  || Vasilevskiy || Canada Life Centre || 15,325 || 24–13–1 || 49 || 
|- align="center" bgcolor="ccffcc"
| 39 || January 10 || Columbus Blue Jackets || 6–3 ||  || Vasilevskiy || Amalie Arena || 19,092 || 25–13–1 || 51 || 
|- align="center" bgcolor="ccffcc"
| 40 || January 12 || Vancouver Canucks || 5–4 ||  || Vasilevskiy || Amalie Arena || 19,092 || 26–13–1 || 53 || 
|- align="center" bgcolor="ccffcc"
| 41 || January 14 || @ St. Louis Blues || 4–2 ||  || Vasilevskiy || Enterprise Center || 18,096 || 27–13–1 || 55 || 
|- align="center" bgcolor="ccffcc"
| 42 || January 16 || @ Seattle Kraken || 4–1 ||  || Vasilevskiy || Climate Pledge Arena || 17,151 || 28–13–1 || 57 || 
|- align="center" bgcolor="ccffcc"
| 43 || January 18 || @ Vancouver Canucks || 5–2 ||  || Elliott || Rogers Arena || 18,792 || 29–13–1 || 59 || 
|- align="center" bgcolor="ffcccc"
| 44 || January 19 || @ Edmonton Oilers || 3–5 ||  || Vasilevskiy || Rogers Place || 17,742 || 29–14–1 || 59 || 
|- align="center" bgcolor="ffcccc"
| 45 || January 21 || @ Calgary Flames || 3–6 ||  || Vasilevskiy || Scotiabank Saddledome || 18,831 || 29–15–1 || 59 || 
|- align="center" bgcolor="ccffcc"
| 46 || January 24 || Minnesota Wild || 4–2 ||  || Vasilevskiy || Amalie Arena || 19,092 || 30–15–1 || 61 || 
|- align="center" bgcolor="ccffcc"
| 47 || January 26 || Boston Bruins || 3–2 ||  || Vasilevskiy || Amalie Arena || 19,092 || 31–15–1 || 63 || 
|- align="center" bgcolor="ccffcc"
| 48 || January 28  || Los Angeles Kings || 5–2 ||  || Vasilevskiy || Amalie Arena || 19,092 || 32–15–1 || 65 || 

|- align="center" bgcolor="bbbbbb"
| colspan="11"|All-Star Break (February 2–5)
|- align="center" bgcolor="ffcccc"
| 49 || February 6 || @ Florida Panthers || 1–7 ||  || Vasilevskiy || FLA Live Arena || 15,882 || 32–16–1 || 65 || 
|- align="center" bgcolor="B0C4DE"
| 50 || February 7 || San Jose Sharks || 3–4 || OT || Elliott || Amalie Arena || 19,092 || 32–16–2 || 66 || 
|- align="center" bgcolor="ccffcc"
| 51 || February 9 || Colorado Avalanche || 5–0 ||  || Vasilevskiy || Amalie Arena || 19,092 || 33–16–2 || 68 || 
|- align="center" bgcolor="ccffcc"
| 52 || February 11 || @ Dallas Stars || 3–1 ||  || Vasilevskiy || American Airlines Center || 18,532 || 34–16–2 || 70 || 
|- align="center" bgcolor="ccffcc"
| 53 || February 14 || @ Colorado Avalanche || 4–3 || SO || Vasilevskiy || Ball Arena || 18,072 || 35–16–2 || 72 || 
|- align="center" bgcolor="B0C4DE"
| 54 || February 15 || @ Arizona Coyotes || 0–1 || SO || Elliott || Mullett Arena || 4,600 || 35–16–3 || 73 || 
|- align="center" bgcolor="ffcccc"
| 55 || February 18 || @ Vegas Golden Knights || 4–5 ||  || Vasilevskiy || T-Mobile Arena || 18,317 || 35–17–3 || 73 || 
|- align="center" bgcolor="ccffcc"
| 56 || February 21 || Anaheim Ducks || 6–1 ||  || Vasilevskiy || Amalie Arena || 19,092 || 36–17–3 || 75 || 
|- align="center" bgcolor="B0C4DE"
| 57 || February 23 || Buffalo Sabres || 5–6 || OT || Vasilevskiy || Amalie Arena || 19,092 || 36–17–4 || 76 || 
|- align="center" bgcolor="ccffcc"
| 58 || February 25 || @ Detroit Red Wings || 3–0 ||  || Vasilevskiy || Little Caesars Arena || 19,515 || 37–17–4 || 78 || 
|- align="center" bgcolor="ffcccc"
| 59 || February 26 || @ Pittsburgh Penguins || 3–7 ||  || Elliott || PPG Paints Arena || 17,691 || 37–18–4 || 78 || 
|- align="center" bgcolor="ffcccc"
| 60 || February 28 || Florida Panthers || 1–4 ||  || Vasilevskiy || Amalie Arena || 19,092 || 37–19–4 || 78 || 

|- align="center" bgcolor="B0C4DE"
| 61 || March 2 || Pittsburgh Penguins || 4–5 || OT || Vasilevskiy || Amalie Arena || 19,092 || 37–19–5 || 79 || 
|- align="center" bgcolor="ffcccc"
| 62 || March 4 || @ Buffalo Sabres || 3–5 ||  || Elliott || KeyBank Center || 19,070 || 37–20–5 || 79 || 
|- align="center" bgcolor="ffcccc"
| 63 || March 5 || @ Carolina Hurricanes || 0–6 ||  || Vasilevskiy || PNC Arena || 18,965 || 37–21–5 || 79 || 
|- align="center" bgcolor="ccffcc"
| 64 || March 7 || Philadelphia Flyers || 5–2 ||  || Vasilevskiy || Amalie Arena || 19,092 || 38–21–5 || 81 || 
|- align="center" bgcolor="B0C4DE"
| 65 || March 9 || Vegas Golden Knights || 3–4 || OT || Vasilevskiy || Amalie Arena || 19,092 || 38–21–6 || 82 || 
|- align="center" bgcolor="ccffcc"
| 66 || March 11 || Chicago Blackhawks || 3–1 ||  || Elliott || Amalie Arena || 19,092 || 39–21–6 || 84 || 
|- align="center" bgcolor="ffcccc"
| 67 || March 12 || Winnipeg Jets || 2–3 ||  || Vasilevskiy || Amalie Arena || 19,092 || 39–22–6 || 84 || 
|- align="center" bgcolor="ccffcc"
| 68 || March 14 || @ New Jersey Devils || 4–1 ||  || Vasilevskiy || Prudential Center || 15,622 || 40–22–6 || 86 || 
|- align="center" bgcolor="ccffcc"
| 69 || March 16 || @ New Jersey Devils || 4–3 || SO || Vasilevskiy || Prudential Center || 16,094 || 41–22–6 || 88 || 
|- align="center" bgcolor="ccffcc"
| 70 || March 18 || Montreal Canadiens || 5–3 ||  || Elliott || Amalie Arena || 19,092 || 42–22–6 || 90 || 
|- align="center" bgcolor="ffcccc"
| 71 || March 19 || New Jersey Devils || 2–5 ||  || Vasilevskiy || Amalie Arena || 19,092 || 42–23–6 || 90 || 
|- align="center" bgcolor=""
| 72 || March 21 || @ Montreal Canadiens ||  ||  ||  || Bell Centre ||  ||  ||  ||
|- align="center" bgcolor=""
| 73 || March 23 || @ Ottawa Senators ||  ||  ||  || Canadian Tire Centre ||  ||  ||  ||
|- align="center" bgcolor=""
| 74 || March 25 || @ Boston Bruins ||  ||  ||  || TD Garden ||  ||  ||  ||
|- align="center" bgcolor=""
| 75 || March 28 || @ Carolina Hurricanes ||  ||  ||  || PNC Arena ||  ||  ||  ||
|- align="center" bgcolor=""
| 76 || March 30 || Washington Capitals ||  ||  ||  || Amalie Arena ||  ||  ||  ||

|- align="center" bgcolor=""
| 77 || April 1 || New York Islanders ||  ||  ||  || Amalie Arena ||  ||  ||  ||
|- align="center" bgcolor=""
| 78 || April 5 || @ New York Rangers ||  ||  ||  || Madison Square Garden ||  ||  ||  ||
|- align="center" bgcolor=""
| 79 || April 6 || @ New York Islanders ||  ||  ||  || UBS Arena ||  || ||  ||
|- align="center" bgcolor=""
| 80 || April 8 || @ Ottawa Senators ||  ||  ||  || Canadian Tire Centre ||  ||  ||  ||
|- align="center" bgcolor=""
| 81 || April 11 || Toronto Maple Leafs ||  ||  ||  || Amalie Arena ||  ||  ||  ||
|- align="center" bgcolor=""
| 82 || April 13 || Detroit Red Wings ||  ||  ||  || Amalie Arena ||  ||  ||  ||

|-
| Lightning score listed first;

Player stats
March 20, 2023

Skaters

Goaltenders

†Denotes player spent time with another team before joining Tampa Bay.  Stats reflect time with Tampa Bay only.
‡Traded from Tampa Bay mid-season.
Bold/italics denotes franchise record

Roster

Suspensions/fines

Awards and honours

Awards

Milestones

Records

Transactions
The Lightning have been involved in the following transactions during the 2022–23 season.

Trades

Free agents

Waivers

Contract terminations

Retirement

Signings

Draft picks

Below are the Tampa Bay Lightning's selections at the 2022 NHL Entry Draft, which was held on July 7 and 8, 2022, at the Bell Centre in Montreal, Quebec.

Notes:
 The Pittsburgh Penguins' third-round pick went to the Tampa Bay Lightning as the result of a trade on July 8, 2022, that sent Chicago's fourth-round pick and Detroit's sixth-round pick both in 2022 (103rd and 169th overall) to Los Angeles in exchange for this pick.
 The New York Rangers' seventh-round pick will go to the Tampa Bay Lightning as the result of a trade on July 17, 2021, that sent Barclay Goodrow to New York in exchange for this pick.

References

Tampa Bay Lightning seasons
Tampa Bay Lightning
Tampa Bay Lightning
Tampa Bay Lightning
Tampa Bay Lightning